The northern Henan battle took place on May 27, 1929, and the location was in northern Henan, China. It was one of the civil war battles that took place inside the National Revolutionary Army. The two warring sides of the division were Han Fuju Army supported by Chiang Kaishek and Pang Bingxun Army supported by Feng Yuxiang. Han was a former subordinate of Feng while Pang had once been a commander of the Zhili clique's Wu Peifu before joining Feng.

References
中華民國國防大學編，《中國現代軍事史主要戰役表》
1929 in China
Conflicts in 1929